Íris Edda Heimisdóttir (born February 8, 1984) is an Icelandic former swimmer, who specialized in breaststroke events. She is a two-time Olympian (2000 and 2004), and a former Icelandic record holder in the 100 and 200 m breaststroke.

Heimisdottir made her Olympic debut, as Iceland's youngest swimmer (aged 16), at the 2000 Summer Olympics in Sydney. There, she failed to reach the semifinals in any of her individual events, finishing thirty-third in the 100 m breaststroke (1:14.07) and thirty-second in the 200 m breaststroke (2:38.52).

At the 2004 Summer Olympics in Athens, Heimisdottir shortened her program, swimming only in the 100 m breaststroke. She cleared a FINA B-standard entry time of 1:13.28 from the Croatian Open Championships in Dubrovnik. She challenged seven other swimmers in the same heat as Sydney, including 13-year-old Yip Tsz Wa of Hong Kong. She rounded out the field to last place by less than 0.18 of a second behind Yip in 1:15.35. Heimisdottir failed to advance into the semifinals, as she placed fortieth overall in the preliminaries.

Shortly after the Olympics, Heimisdottir retired from swimming to pursue her career in professional modeling and physical fitness.

References

1984 births
Living people
Iris Edda Heimisdottir
Iris Edda Heimisdottir
Swimmers at the 2000 Summer Olympics
Swimmers at the 2004 Summer Olympics
Iris Edda Heimisdottir
21st-century Icelandic women